Copestylum lentum is a species of syrphid fly in the family Syrphidae They have been observed in California, Colorado, New Mexico, Arizona, Texas and Mexico.

References

Eristalinae
Diptera of North America
Hoverflies of North America
Articles created by Qbugbot
Taxa named by Samuel Wendell Williston
Insects described in 1887